Hosanger is a village in Osterøy municipality in Vestland county, Norway. The village is located along the Osterfjorden on the northern shore of the island of Osterøy.

The village was the administrative center of the old Hosanger municipality which existed from 1838 until 1964.  Hosanger Church is located in the village.

References

Villages in Vestland
Osterøy